was a Japanese classical and film music composer, best known for his works on the Godzilla franchise.

Biography

Early years in Hokkaido
Akira Ifukube was born on 31 May 1914 in Kushiro, Japan as the third son of a police officer Toshimitsu Ifukube. The origins of this family can be traced back to at least the 7th century with the birth of Ifukibe-no-Tokotarihime. He was strongly influenced by the Ainu music as he spent his childhood (from age of 9 to 12) in Otofuke near Obihiro, where was with a mixed population of Ainu and Japanese. His first encounter with classical music occurred when attending secondary school in Sapporo city. Ifukube decided to become a composer at the age of 14 after hearing a radio performance of Igor Stravinsky's The Rite of Spring, and also cited the music of Manuel de Falla as a major influence.

Ifukube studied forestry at Hokkaido Imperial University in Sapporo and composed in his spare time, which prefigured a line of self-taught Japanese composers.  His first piece was the piano solo, Piano Suite (later the title was changed to Japan Suite, arranged for orchestra), dedicated to George Copeland who was living in Spain. Atsushi Miura, Ifukube's friend at the university, sent a letter to Copeland. Copeland replied, "It is wonderful that you listen my disc in spite of you living in Japan, the opposite side of the earth. I imagine you may compose music. Send me some piano pieces." Then Miura, who was not a composer, presented Ifukube and this piece to Copeland. Copeland promised to interpret it, but the correspondence was unfortunately stopped because of the Spanish Civil War. Ifukube's big break came in 1935, when his first orchestral piece Japanese Rhapsody won the first prize in an international competition for young composers promoted by Alexander Tcherepnin.  The judges of that contest—Albert Roussel, Jacques Ibert, Arthur Honegger, Alexandre Tansman, Tibor Harsányi, Pierre-Octave Ferroud, and Henri Gil-Marchex were unanimous in their selection of Ifukube as the winner.  Ifukube studied modern Western composition while Tcherepnin was visiting Japan, and his Piano Suite received an honourable mention at the I.C.S.M. festival in Venice in 1938. Japanese Rhapsody was performed in Europe on a number of occasions in the late 1930s.

On completing University, he worked as a forestry officer and lumber processor in Akkeshi, and towards the end of the Second World War was appointed by the Imperial Japanese Army to study the elasticity and vibratory strength of wood.  He suffered radiation exposure after carrying out x-rays without protection, a consequence of the wartime lead shortage. Thus, he had to abandon forestry work and became a professional composer and teacher.  Ifukube spent some time in hospital due to the radiation exposure, and was startled one day to hear one of his own marches being played over the radio when General Douglas MacArthur arrived to formalize the Japanese surrender.

From 1946 to 2006 in Tokyo

He taught at the Tokyo University of the Arts (formerly Tokyo Music School), during which period he composed his first film score for Snow Trail, released in 1947.  Over the next fifty years, he would compose more than 250 film scores, the high point of which was his 1954 music for Ishirō Honda's Toho movie, Godzilla.  Ifukube also created Godzilla's trademark roar – produced by rubbing a resin-covered leather glove along the loosened strings of a double bass – and its footsteps, created by striking an amplifier box.

Despite his financial success as a film composer, Ifukube's first love had always been his general classical work as a composer. In fact his compositions for the two genres cross-fertilized each other. For example, he was to recycle his 1953 music for the ballet Shaka, about how the young Siddhartha Gautama eventually became the Buddha, for Kenji Misumi's 1961 film Buddha. Then in 1988 he reworked the film music to create his three-movement symphonic ode Gotama the Buddha. Meanwhile, he had returned to teaching at the Tokyo College of Music, becoming president of the college the following year, and in 1987 retired to become head of the College's ethnomusicology department.

He trained younger generation composers such as Kaoru Wada, Shigeyuki Imai, Satoshi Imai, Toshiro Mayuzumi, Yasushi Akutagawa, Akio Yashiro, Teizo Matsumura, Sei Ikeno, Minoru Miki, Maki Ishii, and Yssimal Motoji.  He also published Orchestration, a 1,000-page book on theory, widely used among Japanese composers.

He died in Tokyo at Meguro-ku Hospital of multiple organ dysfunction on 8 February in 2006, at the age of 91 and buried at the Ube shrine in Tottori.

Honors

The Japanese government awarded Ifukube the Order of Culture. Subsequently, he was awarded the Order of the Sacred Treasure, Third Class.

Tribute
On May 31, 2021, Google celebrated the 107th anniversary of his birth with a Google Doodle.

Works

Orchestral/chamber 
 Japanese Rhapsody (1935)
 Triptyque Aborigène: trois tableaux pour orchestre de chambre  (1937); dedicated to Alexander Tcherepnin.
 Ballet symphonique après Etenraku (1940)
 Symphony Concertante for piano and orchestra (1941)
 Ballata Sinfonica (1943)
 Overture to the Nation of Philippines (1944)
 Arctic Forest (1944)
 Rapsodia Concertante for violin and orchestra (Violin Concerto No. 1) (1948, revised 1951/59/71)
 Salome, ballet (1948, score revised and expanded 1987 for Suite) based on Oscar Wilde's play
 Fire of Prometheus, ballet (1950)
 Drumming of Japan, ballet (1951, revised 1984)
 Sinfonia Tapkaara (1954, revised 1979)
 Ritmica Ostinata for piano and orchestra (1961, revised 1971)
 Ronde in Burlesque for wind orchestra (1972, arranged to orchestra in 1983)
 Violin Concerto No. 2 (1978)
 Lauda concertata for marimba and orchestra (1979)
 Eglogue symphonique for 20-strings koto and orchestra (1982)
 Symphonic Fantasia No. 1 (1983); arrangement from the film scores
 Symphonic Fantasia No. 2 (1983); arrangement from the film scores
 Symphonic Fantasia No. 3 (1983); arrangement from the film scores
 Gotama the Buddha, symphonic ode for mixed chorus and orchestra (1989)
 Japanese Suite for orchestra (1991); arrangement from the piano suite
 Japanese Suite for string orchestra (1998); arrangement from the piano suite

Instrumental
 Piano Suite (1933)
 Toka: Cantilena ballabile sul mode antico de Giappone, for guitar (1967)
 Kugoka for guitar (1969)
 Toccata for guitar (1970)
 Fantasia for baroque lute (1980)
 Sonata for violin and piano (1985)
 Ballata sinfonica for duo-treble and bass 25-stringed koto (2001)

Vocal
 Ancient Minstrelsies of Gilyak Tribes, for soprano and piano (1946)
 Three Lullabies among the Native Tribes on the Island of Sakhalin, for soprano and piano (1949)
 Eclogues after Epos among Aino Races, for soprano and timpani (1950)
 A Shanty of the Shiretoko Peninsula (1961)
 The Sea of Okhotsk for soprano, bassoon, piano (or harp) and double bass (1988)
 Tomo no oto for traditional ensemble and orchestra (1990) 
  for soprano, viola and harp or piano (1992)
 Five Poems after Inaba Manyo (1994); text by Ōtomo no Yakamochi
 La Fontaine sacrée for soprano, viola, bassoon and harp (1964, 2000); arrangement by the composer from the 1964 film score Mothra vs. Godzilla
 Ao Saghi (Grey heron) for soprano, oboe, double bass and piano (2000); text by Genzō Sarashina

Film scores

Notes

References

Sources

External links

 Official website (archived version)
 
 A guide to Ifukube's concert music on CD
 Information about his death in Japanese
 AKIRAIFUKUBE.ORG:A virtual museum dedicated to Akira Ifukube
 Larson, Randall D.  at musicfromthemovies.com
 Milner, David. Yohihiko Shibata (trans.) December 1992 & December 1993. "The Complete Akira Ifukube Interview", Kaiju Fan Online.

1914 births
2006 deaths
20th-century classical composers
20th-century Japanese composers
20th-century Japanese male musicians
Deaths from multiple organ failure
Hokkaido University alumni
Japanese classical composers
Japanese film score composers
Japanese male classical composers
Japanese male film score composers
Japanese Shintoists
La-La Land Records artists
Musicians from Hokkaido
People from Kushiro, Hokkaido
Recipients of the Order of Culture
Recipients of the Order of the Sacred Treasure